Montezumia is a primarily neotropical genus of eumenine wasps whose 48 species (Willink 1982) range from Argentina to the southwestern United States (Arizona). Most of the known species (38 of 52 species and subspecies; Willink 1982) are from South America. Unfortunately, the behaviour of Montezumia species has been described for only eight definitively identified species (ferruginea, dimidiata, cortesioides, vechti, pelagica, brethesi, platinia, and petiolata) (reviewed in Willink 1982).

The genus is specially interesting for illuminating the origins of group life and eusociality (social behaviour characterized by a reproductive division of labor between egg-laying queens and sterile workers). Montezumia belongs to a vespid subfamily (Eumeninae) of primarily solitary wasps which are closely related to the eusocial vespids of the subfamilies Epiponinae and Polistinae

References

 Willink, A. 1982. Revisión de los generos Montezumia Saussure and Monobia Saussure (Hymenoptera: Eumenidae). Bol. Acad. Nac. Cienc., Cordoba 55: 3–321.

Biological pest control wasps
Potter wasps
Hymenoptera genera